The Niue national soccer team is the national soccer team of Niue, controlled by the Niue Island Soccer Association. It was not a member of FIFA, although it was an associate member of the Oceania Football Confederation (OFC) until its membership was revoked in 2021 due to inactivity. Because it wasn't a FIFA member, the team was already ineligible to enter the World Cup even when it was still an OFC member.

Niue has so far played only two games – both at the 1983 South Pacific Games. A 0–14 loss to Tahiti was followed by a 0–19 loss to Papua New Guinea.

Notable players

   Aidan Carey - played for  Auckland City FC

Results
Niue score is shown first in each case.

Record by opponent
Up to matches played on 22 August 1983.

Players

See List of Niue international footballers.

References

 
Oceanian national association football teams